NGC 1279 is a lenticular galaxy estimated to be 324 million light-years away from the Milky Way in the constellation Perseus. It has diameter of about 110,000 ly, and is a member of the Perseus Cluster.

It was discovered on December 12, 1876 by astronomer John Louis Emil Dreyer.

References

External links
 

Perseus (constellation)
Lenticular galaxies
Perseus Cluster
1279
12448 
Astronomical objects discovered in 1876